Sebastian Giampaolo (born 8 January 1959) is an Australian former association football player.

Playing career

Club career
Giampaolo played for APIA, Inter Monaro and Heidelberg in the National Soccer League during the 1980s.

He made two appearances for Canberra Olympic during 2003.

International career
Giampaolo played two matches for Australia. The first match was in 1978 against Greece in Sydney and the second in 1981 against New Zealand.

Honours
In 2009 Giampaolo was inducted into the Capital Football Hall of Fame.

References

1959 births
Australian soccer players
Australia international soccer players
Living people
Association football forwards